Shera Danese (born October 9, 1949) is an American actress and the widow of actor Peter Falk.

Biography

Life and career 
Danese was born Sherry Lynn Kaminski in Hartsdale, New York. She was the 1970 Miss Pennsylvania World. In 1974, Kaminski legally changed her name to Sherry Lynn Danese, later adopting Shera as her first name. 

Her acting career began in 1975 playing the part of Kitty in an episode of the TV series Medical Story (credited as Sherry Danese). She subsequently guest-starred in other TV series during the 1970s, with appearances in One Day at a Time, Serpico, Baretta, Three's Company, Kojak, Family, Hart to Hart, Starsky and Hutch and Charlie's Angels.

In one of her few movie roles, Danese starred with Tom Cruise and Rebecca De Mornay in Risky Business (1983), playing a prostitute named Vicki. In 2005, she appeared alongside her husband Peter Falk in the movie Checking Out.

Columbo (1976–1997) 
Danese had major supporting roles in six episodes of the TV series Columbo, appearing alongside her husband Peter Falk, (who played detective Columbo) in Fade in to Murder (1976), Murder Under Glass (1978), Murder, a Self Portrait (1989), Columbo and the Murder of a Rock Star (1991), Undercover (1994) and A Trace of Murder (1997). Although she played the killer only once, Danese has the distinction of having appeared in more episodes of the series than any other actress.

Personal life 
Danese met Peter Falk on the set of the movie Mikey and Nicky and became his second wife on December 7, 1977. They were married for 33 years until Falk's death on June 23, 2011 at age 83 from complications of Alzheimer's disease and pneumonia. She is mentioned on his headstone: "I'm not here. I'm home with Shera".

Danese was Falk's conservator, and, allegedly, according to his daughter Catherine, prevented some of his family members from visiting him, did not notify them of major changes in his condition, and did not notify them of his death and funeral arrangements. Catherine later encouraged the passage of legislation, called Peter Falk's Law, that provides guidelines that guardians and conservators for an incapacitated person must comply with regarding visitation rights and notice of death. As of 2016 more than ten states had enacted such laws.

References

External links 
 

American film actresses
1949 births
Living people
20th-century American actresses
People from Hartsdale, New York
American television actresses
Actresses from New York (state)
21st-century American women